The 1988 Alaska Milkmen season was the third season of the franchise in the Philippine Basketball Association (PBA).

Transactions

Notable dates
March 22: Alaska Milkmen came back from 11 points down early in the fourth quarter and lean on the charities of import Andrew Kennedy, who scored 50 points, in the closing seconds to eked out a 124–119 win over Ginebra San Miguel in both teams' first game of the season.

April 28: On the final playing date of the elimination round in the Open Conference, Alaska rout Shell Helix, 147–119, as import Andrew Kennedy scored a conference-high 73 points.

July 14: Yoyoy Villamin scored a career-high 44 points as Alaska beats Great Taste, 135–122 in overtime. The Airmen now share top spot with San Miguel and Great Taste, which absorbed their second straight loss, with a 4-2 won-loss slate.

October 4: Willie Bland scored 65 points to lead Alaska to a 136–131 win over Añejo Rum 65, giving new head coach Bogs Adornado his first win, the Rum Masters got 36 points each from their imports Billy Ray Bates and Kevin Gamble.

October 13: After back-to-back losses to Presto and Shell, the Airmen came back with a 128–116 win over unbeaten San Miguel Beermen, which suffered its first setback in four games.

October 20: Willie Bland scored 49 points while new import David Boone, who replaces Eddie Cox, added 28 markers as Alaska scored their fourth win in six games in the Reinforced Conference, winning over Shell, 134–115.

Occurrences
On March 20, during the opening ceremonies of the league's 14th season, the PBA honors three-time MVP William "Bogs" Adornado, giving him a plaque of recognition, as one of the only few remaining pioneers in the league. Adornado announces his retirement from active playing at age 36, he last played for Hills Bros (now Alaska) in the previous season.

Coach Arturo Valenzona resigned from the team a few days after Alaska lost to All-Filipino champion Añejo Rum in the finale of the one-week PBA/IBA Challenge Cup, replacing him from the bench beginning the Third Conference is assistant coach William "Bogs" Adornado.

During the Third Conference, Alaska raced to four wins and two losses, but towards the end of the elimination round, the Airmen lost their last two matches for an even five victories against five defeats. After dropping their first two outings in the semifinals for a four-game losing streak, the last one where import Willie Bland made a crucial error in the closing seconds of Alaska's 106–111 loss to Presto on November 15 put to rest the suspicions that something smells "fishy", the Alaska management went to look into import Willie Bland's controversial plays in the closing minutes wherein the team lost, it was found out Bland was involved in game-fixing, PBA Commissioner Rudy Salud reviewed the tapes and sought assistance of the NBI and CIS to look into suspected game-fixers and Bland was under surveillance and was seen talking to shady characters prior to Alaska's next game, Willie Bland was allowed to slip the country and no case was filed.

Roster

Additions

Subtractions
{| cellspacing="0"
| valign="top" |

Imports

References

Alaska Aces (PBA) seasons
Alaska